Luis Alberto Chucho Bolaños León (born March 27, 1985) is an Ecuadorian professional football midfielder who plays for S.D. Quito.

Club career
Chucho as he is nicknamed has only received international recognition in recent years, during his performance in the 2008 Copa Libertadores with his former team LDU Quito. He was part of the starting line-up for LDU Quito that won the 2008 Copa Libertadores and has since won legend status in Ecuador's capital.

Bolaños made a great performance in the 2008 FIFA Club World Cup. He scored on a beautiful free kick against Pachuca in Liga's 2-0 victory in the semi finals. Liga lost the final to Manchester United 1-0.

On January 8, "El Chucho" signed for Santos in Brazil for the 2009 season. However, he failed to make any impact and after only four months at the club, decided to terminate his contract.

He signed for Internacional on 11 May 2009. He scored a hat trick for Internacional in one of his debut against Coritiba.

On December 21, Bolaños signed for Barcelona in Ecuador for a one year loan for the 2010 season.

On his debut day on February 13, Bolaños scored his first goal with Barcelona from a 30 meters distance shot.

International career
He has been called up several times by Ecuador for the 2010 World Cup Qualifiers. He has made good performances with Ecuador, mainly against Argentina and Colombia. He was called once again to play against Chile and Venezuela.

Assault
On February 25, 2011, Bolaños was attacked by two unknown assailants in an attempted robbery outside Quicentro, a shopping mall in northern Quito. During the attack, Bolaños was shot once in his right shoulder and once in his right arm. He was hospitalized and out of any serious danger.

Honors
LDU Quito
Serie A: 2003, 2007
Copa Libertadores: 2008
Internacional
Suruga Bank Championship: 2009

References

External links

1985 births
Living people
Ecuadorian footballers
Footballers from Quito
Ecuador international footballers
Ecuadorian expatriate footballers
L.D.U. Quito footballers
C.S.D. Macará footballers
Santos FC players
Sport Club Internacional players
Barcelona S.C. footballers
Atlas F.C. footballers
San Martín de San Juan footballers
Chivas USA players
C.D. Cuenca footballers
Fuerza Amarilla S.C. footballers
C.D. Olmedo footballers
Ecuadorian Serie A players
Argentine Primera División players
Major League Soccer players
Liga MX players
Expatriate footballers in Mexico
Expatriate footballers in Brazil
Ecuadorian expatriate sportspeople in Brazil
Expatriate footballers in Argentina
Ecuadorian expatriate sportspeople in Argentina
Expatriate soccer players in the United States
Ecuadorian expatriate sportspeople in the United States
Association football wingers